Audrey Février (born 2 July 1990 in Saint-Malo) is a French former football player. She played for Guingamp of the Division 1 Féminine for eleven seasons and also captained the club before finished her career at US Saint-Malo of the Division 2 Féminine. She is equally adept at playing as either a central defender or a midfielder.

Born in Saint-Malo, Février began playing football with local club Jacques-Cartier Paramé. In 2000, she and her brother, Gaëtan, joined Rennes' youth academy. Neither made a senior appearance for the club, but Audrey would make her Division 1 debut with Guingamp (at the time known as Stade Briochin).

Février played for France at youth level.

References

External links
 
  
 footofeminin profile 

1990 births
Living people
French women's footballers
Sportspeople from Saint-Malo
Women's association football defenders
Women's association football midfielders
Footballers from Brittany
Division 1 Féminine players